Bunyip Football Club, nicknamed The Bulldogs, is an Australian rules football club in the West Gippsland Football Competition. The club is based in the small town of Bunyip, in the Gippsland region of Victoria, Australia.

History   
  
When the West Gippsland FA became the Central Gippsland FL in 1909, Bunyip won the competition first flag. The club stayed in the Central gippsland league until 1926 when it became a founding member of the West Gippsland FL.The club won three flags in the WGFL, including the 1939 flag when their rivals, Garfield didn't turn up because it was raining. Reforming after the war the 1945 premiership was the last in the WGFL, rival town's population was growing at a faster rate and Bunyip found the competition was too hard.
In 1982 the club transferred to the Ellinbank & District Football League, playing against town sides that were similar in size, the club has won three premierships, 1990, 2000,& 2012. In the 2016 AFL Gippsland review, Bunyip FC moved to the newly revived West Gippsland Competition along with teams from the Ellinbank & District FL and the Alberton FL.

Premierships
Central Gippsland Football Association
 1905
Central Gippsland Football League
 1909, 1912, 1915
Bunyip Neerim FA
 1936
West Gippsland Football League
 1938, 1939, 1945
Ellinbank & District Football League
 1990, 2000, 2012

VFL/AFL
 Ben Ross - North Melbourne, 
 Michael Ross - 
 Tom Papley -

References

External links
Official EDFL website

Australian rules football clubs in Victoria (Australia)
Australian rules football clubs established in 1879
1879 establishments in Australia